Baron Kershaw, of Prestwich in the County Palatine of Lancaster, is a title in the Peerage of the United Kingdom. It was created in 1947 for Fred Kershaw, who later served as a Lord-in-waiting in the Labour government of Clement Attlee.  the title is held by his grandson, the fourth Baron, who succeeded his father in 1962 (who in his turn had succeeded his elder brother in 1961).

Barons Kershaw (1947)
Fred Kershaw, 1st Baron Kershaw (1881–1961)
Herbert Kershaw, 2nd Baron Kershaw (1904–1961)
Edward Aubrey Kershaw, 3rd Baron Kershaw (1906–1962)
Edward John Kershaw, 4th Baron Kershaw (b. 1936)

The heir apparent is the present holder's son Hon. John Charles Edward Kershaw (b. 1971).
The heir apparent's heir, and next in line, is his son Edward John George Kershaw (b. 2001)

Notes

References

Kidd, Charles, Williamson, David (editors). Debrett's Peerage and Baronetage (1990 edition). New York: St Martin's Press, 1990, 

Baronies in the Peerage of the United Kingdom
Noble titles created in 1947